Andrey Ippolitovich Vilkitsky (— ) was a Russian hydrographer and surveyor. He was born in the Minsk Governorate. His son, Boris Vilkitsky followed up his father's work; the Vilkitsky Islands are named after him.

See also
 Russian Hydrographic Service

References

External links
 Biography, Polarpost

1858 births
1913 deaths
People from Borisovsky Uyezd
Belarusian nobility
Russian explorers
Explorers from the Russian Empire
Explorers of the Arctic
Explorers of Siberia
Recipients of the Order of St. Vladimir, 3rd class
Recipients of the Order of St. Anna, 3rd class
Recipients of the Order of Saint Stanislaus (Russian), 1st class